is a railway station on the Rias Line in the village of  Noda, Iwate, Japan, operated by the third-sector railway operator Sanriku Railway.

Lines

Station layout
The station has one side platform serving a single bi-directional track. The station is unstaffed.

Adjacent stations

History
Initially given the provisional name , construction work on the new station started on 3 August 2016. The name Tofugaura-Kaigan for the station was selected and formally announced in November 2016. The station opened on 25 March 2017. Minami-Rias Line, a portion of Yamada Line, and Kita-Rias Line constitute Rias Line on 23 March 2019. Accordingly, this station became an intermediate station of Rias Line.

Surrounding area
National Route 45

See also
 List of railway stations in Japan

References

External links

  

Railway stations in Iwate Prefecture
Railway stations in Japan opened in 2017
Rias Line
Fudai, Iwate